D. C. Lau (6 March 192126 April 2010) was a Chinese sinologist and author of the widely read translations of Tao Te Ching, Mencius and The Analects and contributed to the Proper Cantonese pronunciation movement.

D. C. Lau studied Chinese under Prof. Xu Dishan at the University of Hong Kong, but fled to Mainland China in 1941 just before the Japanese occupied Hong Kong.  In 1946, he was offered one of the first scholarships for a British university and studied Western philosophy in Glasgow University (1946–49).  In 1950, Lau would take up a post at London University's School of Oriental and African Studies, developing SOAS into a world-renowned centre for the study of Chinese philosophy.

He was appointed in 1965 to the newly created Readership in Chinese Philosophy and in 1970 became Professor of Chinese in the University of London. In 1978 he returned to Hong Kong to take up the Chair of Chinese Language and Literature at the Chinese University of Hong Kong. On his retirement in 1989, he began to computerise the entire body of extant ancient Chinese works, with a series of sixty concordances.

Bibliography

References 

1921 births
2010 deaths
Chinese sinologists
Alumni of King's College, Hong Kong
Academics of SOAS University of London
Hong Kong expatriates in the United Kingdom